Krisna Bayu Otto Kartika (born 15 October 1999) is an Indonesian professional footballer who plays as an midfielder for Liga 1 club Persik Kediri.

Club career

Persik Kediri
He was signed for Persik Kediri to play in Liga 2 in the 2019 season. On 25 November 2019 Persik successfully won the 2019 Liga 2 Final and promoted to Liga 1, after defeated Persita Tangerang 3–2 at the Kapten I Wayan Dipta Stadium, Gianyar.

Career statistics

Club

Honours

Club 
Persik Kediri
 Liga 2: 2019

References

External links
 Krisna Bayu Otto at Soccerway
 Krisna Bayu Otto at Liga Indonesia

1999 births
Living people
Indonesian Muslims
Indonesian footballers
Liga 1 (Indonesia) players
Persik Kediri players
Association football midfielders
People from Kediri (city)
Sportspeople from East Java